Sougoulbé is a commune of the Cercle of Ténenkou in the Mopti Region of Mali. The principal village is Kora. The commune contains 17 small villages and in 2009 had a population of 9,099.

References

External links
.

Communes of Mopti Region